Rhombodera lingulata is a species of praying mantises in the family Mantidae, found in Asia.

References

Further reading

 

L
Mantodea of Asia
Insects described in 1877